This uniform polyhedron compound is a composition of 5 small cubicuboctahedra, in the same vertex arrangement as the compound of 5 small rhombicuboctahedra.

References 
.

Polyhedral compounds